El Peñón (Spanish: the rock) may refer to:

El Peñón, Dominican Republic, a town in the Barahona province of the Dominican Republic.
El Peñón (Catamarca), a village and municipality in Catamarca Province in northwestern Argentina.
El Peñón, Bolívar, a town and municipality located in the Bolívar Department, northern Colombia.
El Peñón, Cundinamarca, a town and municipality of Colombia in the department of Cundinamarca
El Peñón, Santander, a town and municipality in the Santander Department in northeastern Colombia.
El Peñón (Antarctica), a monolithic formation on Livingston Island in the South Shetland Islands, Antarctica.
El Peñón mine, one of the largest gold mines in Chile and in the world.

See also
El Peñón de las Ánimas, a Mexican movie of 1942, directed by Miguel Zacarías
El Peñon de Guatape (monolith), a monolithic formation located at the municipality of Guatape in Antioquia, Colombia
Peñón